Audience of One may refer to:

 "Audience of One" (song), a 2008 song by Rise Against
 Audience of One (album), a 2009 album by Heather Headley
 Audience of One, former band of Circa Survive frontman Anthony Green
 Audience of One (film), a 2007 documentary directed by Michael Jacobs

See also
 Audience (disambiguation)